Egil Lindberg  (6 June 1906 – 25 June 1952) was a  Norwegian radio officer and Secret Intelligence Service agent during World War II.

He had a background from the weather stations at Jan Mayen and Bjørnøya.

References

1906 births
1952 deaths
Norwegian resistance members
Secret Intelligence Service personnel